Marlow H. Colvin (born 1964) is a former Democratic member of the Illinois House of Representatives, representing the 33rd District from 2001 to 2012. He is a graduate of St. Felicitas Elementary School, St. Willibrord Catholic High School and Chicago State University where he earned a degree in political science.

In March 2012, one week after winning an unopposed primary for renomination to his seat, Colvin announced he was resigning from the House in order to assume a private sector job with Commonwealth Edison.

References

External links
Illinois General Assembly - Representative Marlow H. Colvin (D) official IL House website
Bills Committees
Project Vote Smart - Representative Marlow H. Colvin (IL) profile
Follow the Money - Marlow H Colvin
2006 2004 2002 campaign contributions
Illinois House Democrats - Marlow Colvin profile
Interview regarding his hometown neighborhood Chatham

1964 births
Living people
African-American state legislators in Illinois
Democratic Party members of the Illinois House of Representatives
Politicians from Chicago
Chicago State University alumni
21st-century American politicians
21st-century African-American politicians
20th-century African-American people